Sipiwesk station is a flag stop station in Sipiwesk, Manitoba, Canada.  The stop is served by Via Rail's Winnipeg – Churchill train. Sipiwesk is located in the Local Government District of Mystery Lake.

Footnotes

External links 
Via Rail Station Information

Via Rail stations in Manitoba